Den Danske Salmebog (The Danish Psalm Book or The Danish Hymnal) is a book of 791 hymns used by the Church of Denmark. It has been published in several editions, the latest issued in 2003. As well as hymns, it contains the Church's Church Order, an altar book, prayers and excerpts from Luther's Small Catechism.

Chapters
 1-14: General hymns
 15-51: Faith in God the Father
 52-279: Faith in the Son of God
 280-317: Faith in God the Holy Spirit
 318-374: The Holy Catholic Church
 375-486: The Communion of Saints
 487-523: The Forgiveness of Sins
 524-575: Flesh Resurrection and Eternal Life
 576-698: Christian Life
 699-791: Human Life

External links

Lutheran hymnals
Church of Denmark